Comrades (German:Kameraden) is a 1921 German silent film directed by Curt Courant and starring Elsa Wagner, Max Gülstorff and Ernst Matray.

Cast
 Elsa Wagner as Gröfin Bolz  
 Max Gülstorff as Sohn  
 Ernst Matray as Diener  
 Stefan Vacano as Milford  
 Katta Sterna as Tochter Mary

References

Bibliography
 Hans-Michael Bock and Tim Bergfelder. The Concise Cinegraph: An Encyclopedia of German Cinema. Berghahn Books.

External links

1921 films
Films of the Weimar Republic
German silent feature films
German black-and-white films